{{DISPLAYTITLE:N-Formylkynurenine}}N′-Formylkynurenine''' is an intermediate in the catabolism of tryptophan.  It is a formylated derivative of kynurenine. The formation of N''′-formylkynurenine is catalyzed by heme dioxygenases.

See also
 Indoleamine 2,3-dioxygenase

References

Amino acids
Formamides